Eligio Antonio Insfrán Orué (Asunción - October 27, 1935) is a Paraguayan football forward who played for Paraguay in the 1958 FIFA World Cup. He also played for Club Guaraní.

References

External links
FIFA profile

Living people
Sportspeople from Asunción
Paraguayan footballers
Paraguay international footballers
Association football forwards
Club Guaraní players
1958 FIFA World Cup players
1935 births